Long Shot is a 1939 American horse racing film directed by Charles Lamont.

The film is also known as The Long Shot.

Plot

Henry Sharon is about to be ruined financially by rival stable owner Lew Ralston when he gets an idea to fake his own death. His prize horse Certified Check is bequeathed to niece Martha, a young woman Ralston had hoped to marry.

Martha and friend Jeff Clayton begin to enter Certified Check in races, but he always loses. Then they get a tip that the horse hates running near the rail.

Given an outside post, Certified Check has a legitimate shot to win the big stakes race at Santa Anita, but first he must be kept out of sight to keep Ralston from sabotaging his chances.

Cast 
Gordon Jones as Jeff Clayton
Marsha Hunt as Martha Sharon
C. Henry Gordon as Lew Ralston
George Meeker as Dell Baker
Harry Davenport as Henry Sharon
George E. Stone as Danny Welch
Frank Darien as Zeb Jenkins
Tom Kennedy as Mike Claurens
Emerson Treacy as Henry Knox
Gay Seabrook as Helen Knox
Benny Burt as Joe Popopopolis
James Robinson as Tucky
Denmore Chief as Certified Check
Joe Hernandez as Racing Announcer
James Keefe as Racing Announcer

Wilson Benge, Dorothy Fay, Earle Hodgins, Wilbur Mack, Carl Meyer, Lee Phelps, Norman Phillips, Jason Robards Sr. and Claire Rochelle appear uncredited.

External links 

1939 films
1939 drama films
American black-and-white films
American horse racing films
Films directed by Charles Lamont
Grand National Films films
American drama films
1930s English-language films
1930s American films